George Hoskins may refer to:

 George Hoskins (Australian footballer) (1916–1995), Australian rules footballer with Fitzroy
 George Gilbert Hoskins (1824–1893), Lieutenant Governor of New York, 1880–1883
 George Gordon Hoskins (1837–1911), English architect
 George W. Hoskins (1864–1958), American football and basketball coach
 George Hoskins (athlete) (1928–2000), New Zealand middle-distance athlete

See also
 George Hosking (born 1944), founder of the WAVE Trust